Algua is a comune (municipality) in the Province of Bergamo in the Italian region Lombardy, located about  northeast of Milan and about  north of Bergamo.

The municipality of Algua contains the frazioni (subdivisions, mainly villages and hamlets) Frerola, Pagliaro, Sambusita and Rigosa.

Algua borders the following municipalities: Aviatico, Bracca, Costa di Serina, Nembro, San Pellegrino Terme, Selvino, Serina, and Zogno.

References

Articles which contain graphical timelines